Digital Love may refer to:

"Digital Love" (Daft Punk song), 2001
"Digital Love" (Digital Farm Animals song), 2017
"Digital Love", a 1981 song by Amii Stewart